Lu Ann Simms (July 11, 1932 – September 21, 2003) was an American singer. She released pop 45s on Columbia Records between 1952 and 1957, Jubilee Records between 1957 and 1960 (in addition to her sole LP), Top Rank Records in 1960, Vee-Jay Records in 1963 and Wand Records in 1965. She also released a handful of children's records on Columbia Records between 1953 and 1955. Her recordings were licensed by such record labels as Philips Records and Coronet Records for release outside the United States. 

Simms also managed the music publishing estate of her late first husband, Loring Buzzell, which included the firms Calyork Music, Inc., Colby Music, Ltd. and Hecht-Lancaster & Buzzell Music, Inc., the last of which she initially renamed Hecht & Buzzell Music, Inc. (after the departure of partner Burt Lancaster), and then later in 1965, Colby Music, Inc.

Pop releases

Albums

Singles

Extended plays

Album compilations

Various artist compilations

Junior releases 
This section documents releases that were made for children.

Singles

Compilations

Featured or guest releases 
This section documents releases for which Simms provided backing vocals.

Albums

Singles

References

External links 

 
 
 
 

Discographies of American artists